Aaron ben Zerah was a French Jew who suffered martyrdom at Estella in the Kingdom of Navarre on March 5, 1328. Banished from his original home in 1306 by order of King Philip the Fair of France, who confiscated his property, he sought refuge at Estella, where, after a residence of twenty years, he, his wife, and several of his sons were slaughtered by Christian population in an anti-Jewish revolt. The horrors of that event are described in "Ẓedah la-Derek," a work written by Aaron's son Menahem, who escaped death.

References

Year of birth unknown
1328 deaths
14th-century French Jews
Executed French people
People from Estella Oriental
Jewish martyrs
1328 in Europe
People executed by Spain
14th-century executions
14th-century people from the Kingdom of Navarre